The 1979 European Parliament election in Greenland was the election of the delegation from the constituent country Greenland of the Kingdom of Denmark to the European Parliament in 1979.

Results

See also
1979 European Parliament election in Denmark
Greenland (European Parliament constituency)

References

Archivo electoral de la Generalidad Valenciana

Greenland
European Parliament elections in Greenland
Elections in Greenland
1979 in Greenland